Miss Moneypenny's  is a house music party club, founded in Birmingham, England in 1986 and is hosted at a purpose-built venue in the Hockley area of the city.

Miss Moneypenny's, which styles itself as "The World's Most Glamorous Clubbing Brand", has been throwing parties and events throughout the world since the 1990s. It has become an internationally recognised house music brand that hosts themed events, releases albums, and brings its events to various venues, all to a backdrop of musical excellence by a group of very experienced in-house and guest DJs.  The club has been regularly featured on BBC Radio 1, in various DJ magazines, and has been voted a top UK dance nightclub since the early 1990s, renowned for its flamboyance, lavish decor, clientele, and costumed dancers.

History
Miss Moneypenny's evolved as a weekly club event out of the extravagant, one-off ‘Chuff Chuff’ rave parties, a long-running and hedonistic house music event. Chuff Chuff was founded by Mick, Jim, and Dermot Ryan, and Lee Garrick and was initially held as a fancy-dress boat party.

Miss Moneypenny's was started in the summer of 1993 as a weekly Saturday-night event in Bonds nightclub in Birmingham and with resident DJ's Russell Salsbury and Simon Owen.  The "Miss Moneypennys" name was chosen because of its association with the James Bond theme suggested by the name of the venue where the night was hosted.

Miss Moneypenny's began to hold other weekly residencies,  at The Canal in Wolverhampton, The Church and Liberty's in Birmingham, SKOOL in London, and specialised nights such as MP'S, which was held at the Academy, Stoke-on-Trent, and a special student night, named Jelly Baby.

Development outside the UK
Miss Moneypenny's residencies, Chuff Chuff nights, tours and radio broadcasts use the slogan "The Worlds Most Glamorous Clubbing Brand". The brand has been throwing parties and events throughout the world for over twenty five years, making it one of the UK's and Europe's longest-running club brands for house music.

Miss Moneypenny’s has had residencies at venues in a number of European beach-holiday areas including a fourteen-year residency at the BCM superclub in Magaluf, Mallorca, as well as summer residencies in Tenerife, Marbella, Cyprus, Malta, Greece and Turkey. The club also had a 14-year residency at the former El Divino nightclub in Ibiza before it closed in 2009.

The brand has also spread further afield through a constant worldwide touring schedule taking in Dubai, China, Singapore, Kuala Lumpur, Australia, Hong Kong, Russia, Lebanon, the United States of America, Brazil, Colombia, and South Africa. There have been regular events in the European countries of France, Spain, Germany, Austria, Switzerland, Romania, Luxembourg, the Netherlands and Belgium.

Compilation albums

In addition to its touring events, Miss Moneypenny's has successfully released a series of worldwide compilation albums on an annual basis, 16 to date, as well as a consistent release schedule of commercial and underground dance tracks on its own in-house music record label, Miss Moneypenny’s Music.

Radio
Miss Moneypenny’s has entered the medium of radio, with a syndicated dance music show, presented by Miss Moneypenny's Musical Director, and longtime resident DJ, Jim ‘Shaft’ Ryan.

References

Nightclubs in Birmingham, West Midlands